Krasny May , rural localities in Russia, may refer to:

 Krasny May, Charyshsky District, Altai Krai, a selo
 Krasny May, Pavlovsky District, Altai Krai, a settlement
 Krasny May, Belgorod Oblast, a khutor
 Krasny May, Kursk Oblast, a khutor
 Krasny May, Mari El, a settlement
 Krasny May, Nizhny Novgorod Oblast, a village
 Krasny May, Ryazan Oblast, a settlement
 Krasny May, Kashinsky District, Tver Oblast, a settlement
 Krasny May, Udomelsky District, Tver Oblast, a settlement